Kotredež is a settlement north of Zagorje ob Savi in central Slovenia. The area is part of the traditional region of Upper Carniola. It is now included with the rest of the municipality in the Central Sava Statistical Region.

The local church is dedicated to Saint James and belongs to the Parish of Zagorje ob Savi. It dates to the 18th century.

References

External links
Kotredež on Geopedia

Populated places in the Municipality of Zagorje ob Savi